Fongoro, or Gele, is a nearly extinct Central Sudanic language of uncertain classification spoken in Chad and formerly in Sudan.

References

Roger Blench (2012) Nilo-Saharan language listing

Bongo–Bagirmi languages